All the Way Home is a 1963 drama film directed by Alex Segal and starring Jean Simmons, Robert Preston, Pat Hingle, and Michael Kearney. The plot is about a young boy and his mother dealing with the sudden death of his father. It was based on the 1957 James Agee novel A Death in the Family and the 1960 Tad Mosel play All the Way Home.

Plot

Cast
Jean Simmons as Mary Follett
Robert Preston as Jay Follett
Pat Hingle as Ralph Follett
Aline MacMahon as Aunt Hannah
Thomas Chalmers as Joel
John Cullum as Andrew
Helen Carew as Mary's mother
Ronnie Claire Edwards as Sally
John Henry Faulk as Walter Starr
Mary Perry as Great-aunt Sadie
Lylah Tiffany as Great-great-grandmaw
Edwin Wolfe as John Henry
Michael Kearney as Rufus Follett
David Huddleston (uncredited)

See also
List of American films of 1963

References

Further reading 

 Paul F. Brown, Rufus: James Agee in Tennessee, Knoxville: University of Tennessee Press, 422 pages, 2018. . The book's appendix details the making and premiere of the film All the Way Home.

External links 

 
 

1963 films
1963 drama films
American black-and-white films
American drama films
American films based on plays
1960s English-language films
Films about grieving
Films based on adaptations
Films based on American novels
Films directed by Alex Segal
Films set in 1915
Films set in Tennessee
Films shot in Tennessee
Paramount Pictures films
1960s American films